Defiant Imagination is the third and final full-length studio album by the Canadian melodic death metal band Quo Vadis. It was released on November 4, 2004 by Skyscraper Music.

Track listing

Personnel
Quo Vadis
Bart Frydrychowicz – lead and rhythm guitars
Yanic Bercier – drums, backing vocals
Stéphane Paré – vocals

Guest musicians
Steve DiGiorgio – bass
William Seghers – lead guitar
Roxanne Constantin – keyboard, soprano, alto
Elizabeth Giroux – cello

Quo Vadis Choir
Roxanne Constantin
Bart Frydrychowicz
Marco Calliari
Sophie Martin
Arianne Fleury
Marc Vaillancourt
Oscar Souto
Julie Bélanger Roy
Mathieu Groulx
Carlos Lopez

Guest vocals
Marco Calliari – guest vocals in "Tunnel Effect"
Oscar Souto – guest vocals in "Tunnel Effect"
Ian Campbell – guest vocals in "To the Bitter End"
Alexandre Erian – guest vocals in "To the Bitter End"
Armen – guest vocals in "To the Bitter End"

References

2004 albums
Quo Vadis (band) albums